This is a list of Belgian television related events from 1983.

Events
19 March - Pas de Deux are selected to represent Belgium at the 1983 Eurovision Song Contest with their song "Rendez-vous". They are selected to be the twenty-eighth Belgian Eurovision entry during Eurosong held at the Amerikaans Theater in Brussels.

Debuts

Television shows

1980s
Tik Tak (1981-1991)

Ending this year

Births
10 January - Hein Blondeel, actor
26 August - Pim Symoens, singer & TV host
17 September - Erika Van Tielen, TV host

Deaths